On 14 August 2022, at 13:23 local time, a large explosion took place in the Surmalu shopping centre in the Armenian capital of Yerevan. It caused widespread destruction and fire, leaving dozens of dead and injured. The explosion killed 16 people and injured 63, with nine missing as of 20 August.

Events
The explosion occurred at a fireworks warehouse, which tore through the Surmalu shopping centre in Yerevan. A large fire ensued and destroyed much of the market. 200 firefighters attended the scene.

Response
The victims were named the following day. Prime Minister Nikol Pashinyan visited the scene of the blast with Mayor of Yerevan Hrachya Sargsyan, Minister of Emergency Situations Armen Pambukhchyan, director of the rescue service Armen Gasparyan, and head of the Office of Coordination of Inspection Bodies Artur Asoyan.

References

August 2022 events in Armenia
2022 disasters in Armenia
2022 fires in Asia
2022 fires in Europe
Explosions in 2022
2022 explosion
Explosions in Armenia